The 4th Africa Movie Academy Awards ceremony was held on 26 April 2008 at the Transcorp Hilton Hotel, Abuja, Nigeria, to honor the best African films of 2007. The ceremony was broadcast live on Nigerian national television. Special guest of honor at the event was Hollywood actress Angela Bassett.

The nominees were announced to a large gathering of African film industry representatives, African actresses & actors on 19 March 2008 in Johannesburg, South Africa by African Movie Academy Awards CEO Peace Anyiam-Osigwe.

Winners

Major Awards 
The winners of the Award Categories are listed first and highlighted in bold letters.

Other Awards
The winners are written first and emboldened and not all categories had winners.

Best Film African Diaspora
Through the Fire (film)
Bleeding Rose

Best Drama (Short)
Kingswill – Sirrie Mange Entertainment
Magical Blessings
Sky line

Best Animation
 The Lunatic – Ebele OkoyeBest First Film by a DirectorDaniel Adenimokan (Special Mention)Best ComedyStronger than Pain

Multiple Nominations
The following films had the highest number of nominations.
14 Nominations
Across the Niger
12 Nominations
White Water
Princess Tyra
9 Nominations
Run Baby Run
8 Nominations
30 Days

Multiple Awards
The following films won the most awards on the Night
4 awards
Run Baby Run
White Waters
3 Awards
Stronger than Pain

References

Africa Movie Academy Awards
Africa Movie Academy Awards
Africa Movie Academy Awards ceremonies
Award
Africa Movie Academy Awards